It Goes Like This is a 2013 album by Thomas Rhett

It Goes Like This may also refer to:

It Goes Like This album by Scott Krippayne 2003
"It Goes Like This (That Funny Melody)" Irving Caesar, Cliff Friend 1952 Chet Atkins discography
 "It Goes Like This", a collaboration with the band Sixwire from Pictures (John Michael Montgomery album) 2002
It Goes Like This (song) by Thomas Rhett